Paatos is the first live album and the fifth release overall by the Swedish progressive rock band Paatos.

Track listing
 "Happiness" – 5:26 
 "Your Misery" – 5:20 
 "Gasoline" – 5:14 
 "Téa" – 6:09 
 "Hypnotique" – 7:14 
 "Absinth Minded" – 4:09 
 "Sensor" – 9:42
Bonus tracks
 "Prologue" – 8:31*
 "Shame" – 4:54*

Personnel
Adapted from Discogs.
Petronella Nettermalm - lead vocals
Peter Nylander - guitars, backing vocals, mixing
Stefan Dimle - bass
Johan Wallén - keyboards
Huxflux Nettermalm - drums, loops, backing vocals
Carl Michael Herlöfsson - mastering
Wouter "Baloo" Nagtegaal - recording of tracks 1 through 7

References

Paatos albums
2007 live albums